Rae Norman (April 1, 1958 – November 14, 2020) was an American actress.

Among mainly television acting appearances, she may be best known for her appearance in the Star Trek: The Next Generation episode "Tapestry" and in The Harsh Life of Veronica Lambert (2009).

She is also credited as Rendé Rae Norman and Rendi Rae Norman.

Filmography

References

External links
 

American television actresses
Actresses from Oklahoma
1958 births
2020 deaths
21st-century American women